Clementina Teti-Tomassi is a Canadian politician. Currently a member of Montreal City Council, she represents the Marie-Clarac ward in the borough of Montréal-Nord. First elected in the 2009 municipal election, she previously served as the ward's borough councillor.

She is married to Tony Tomassi, a former member of the National Assembly of Quebec. When her husband was implicated in an ethical scandal which resulted in his suspension from the Quebec Liberal Party caucus in 2011, both mayor Gérald Tremblay and civic opposition leader Louise Harel expressed public confidence in Teti-Tomassi, agreeing that she should not be assumed guilty by association.

References

Montreal city councillors
Women in Quebec politics
Living people
Women municipal councillors in Canada
People from Montréal-Nord
Year of birth missing (living people)